Biological functionalism is an anthropological paradigm, asserting that all social institutions, beliefs, values and practices serve to address pragmatic concerns. In many ways, the theorem derives from the longer-established structural functionalism, yet the two theorems diverge from one another significantly. While both maintain the fundamental belief that a social structure is composed of many interdependent frames of reference, biological functionalists criticise the structural view that a social solidarity and collective conscience is required in a functioning system. By that fact, biological functionalism maintains that our individual survival and health is the driving provocation of actions, and that the importance of social rigidity is negligible.

Everyday application
Although the actions of humans without doubt do not always engender positive results for the individual, a biological functionalist would argue that the intention was still self-preservation, albeit unsuccessful. An example of this is the belief in luck as an entity; while a disproportionately strong belief in good luck may lead to undesirable results, such as a huge loss in money from gambling, biological functionalism maintains that the newly created ability of the gambler to condemn luck will allow them to be free of individual blame, thus serving a practical and individual purpose. In this sense, biological functionalism maintains that while bad results often occur in life, which do not serve any pragmatic concerns, an entrenched cognitive psychological motivation was attempting to create a positive result, in spite of its eventual failure.

References

Anthropology
Cognition
Functionalism (social theory)